= 1947 Victorian local elections =

- 30 August 1947

The 1947 Victorian local elections were held on 30 August 1947 to elect the councils of the local government areas in Victoria, Australia.

Until the 1994 reforms introduced by the Kennett state government, all local elections were staggered, with not all councillors up for election each year.
